Mikhail Mikhailovich Postnikov (27 October 1927 – 27 May 2004) was a Soviet mathematician, known for his work in algebraic and differential topology.

Biography 
He was born in Shatura, near Moscow. He received his Ph.D. from Moscow State University under the direction of Lev Pontryagin, and then became a professor at this university. He died in Moscow.

Selected publications 
 Fundamentals of Galois theory, 1961; 142 pp. Dover reprint, 2004
 The variational theory of geodesics, Translated from the Russian by Scripta Technica, Inc. Edited by Bernard R. Gelbaum. Saunders, Philadelphia, Pa., 1967; 200 pp.
 Linear algebra and differential geometry. Translated from the Russian by Vladimir Shokurov. Mir Publishers, 1982; 319 pp.
 Smooth manifolds, Mir Publishers, 1989; 511 pp.
 Geometry VI: Riemannian Geometry, Springer, 2001, 504 pp.

French 
 Leçons de géométrie : Semestre I : Géométrie analytique, Éditions Mir, 1981; 279 pp.
 Leçons de géométrie : Semestre II : Algèbre linéaire et géométrie différentielle, Éditions Mir, 1981; 263 pp.
 Leçons de géométrie : Semestre III : Variétés différentiables, Éditions Mir, 1990; 431 pp.
 Leçons de géométrie : Semestre IV : Géométrie différentielle, Éditions Mir, 1990; 439 pp.
 Leçons de géométrie : Semestre V : Groupes et algèbres de Lie, Éditions Mir, 1985; 374 pp.

See also 
Postnikov system
Postnikov square

References

Bibliography 

1927 births
2004 deaths
20th-century Russian mathematicians
Topologists
Soviet mathematicians
Perm State University alumni
Moscow State University alumni
People from Shatursky District